Alaska Passage is a 1959 drama film directed by Edward Bernds and starring Bill Williams and Naura Hayden.

It was the first film from Associated Producers Inc to go into general release.

Premise
Al manages a company in a small town from which trucks make regular runs to Fairbanks.

Cast
 Bill Williams as Al Graham
 Naura Hayden as Tina Boyd (as Nora Hayden)
 Lyn Thomas as Janet Mason
 Leslie Bradley as Gerard Mason
 Nick Dennis as Pete Harris
 Raymond Hatton as Prospector Hank
 Fred Sherman as Radabaugh
 Court Shepard as Mac Killop (as Court Sheppard)
 Gregg Martell as McCormick
 Jess Kirkpatrick as Barney
 Jorie Wyler as Claudette
 Tommy Cook as Hubie
 Gene Roth
 Al Baffert
 Ralph Sanford as Anderson

Production
Alaska Passage was the first film made by Associated Producers, who had a deal with Fox to make one film a year. It was also known as Alaska Highway.

See also
 List of American films of 1959

References

External links 
 
 
 
 

1959 drama films
1959 films
20th Century Fox films
American drama films
1950s English-language films
Films directed by Edward Bernds
1950s American films